David Guthardt (born 24 October 1958) is a New Zealand cricketer. He played in ten first-class and ten List A matches for Central Districts from 1985 to 1989.

See also
 List of Central Districts representative cricketers

References

External links
 

1958 births
Living people
New Zealand cricketers
Central Districts cricketers
Cricketers from Nelson, New Zealand